Stelidota octomaculata is a species of sap-feeding beetle in the family Nitidulidae. It is endemic to North America.

References

Further reading

 
 

Nitidulidae
Articles created by Qbugbot
Beetles described in 1825